The 1992 All-Ireland Senior Club Camogie Championship for the leading clubs in the women's team field sport of camogie was won by Glen Rovers, who defeated Rathnure from Wexford in the final, played at Glen Rovers.

Arrangements
The championship was organised on the traditional provincial system used in Gaelic Games since the 1880s, with Portglenone and Pearses winning the championships of the other two provinces. Deep into added time, Bernie Higgins scored an equalizer, Rathnure's first score of the second half. Geraldine Codd and Norma Carty added points. Pearses led by a point at the end of normal time.

The Final
Glen Rovers had an easy victory in atrocious conditions, fielding five of the players who had helped Cork to win the All-Ireland Senior Championship two months earlier. Galway player, Ann Coleman, sister of All-Ireland hurler, Michael Coleman was the Rovers star alongside Sandie Fitzgibbon, Therese O'Callaghan, Mary Ring and Linda Mellerick Goalkeeper Mary Fleming was the Rathnure star.

Final stages

References

External links
 Camogie Association

1992 in camogie
1992